UOF may refer to

 Uniform Office Format
 Université de l'Ontario français